Zhoda Airport  is located adjacent to Zhoda, Manitoba, Canada.

References

Registered aerodromes in Manitoba